Statistics of the UAE Football League for the 1991–92 season.

Overview
It was contested by 16 teams, and Al Wasl FC won the championship.

League standings

References
United Arab Emirates - List of final tables (RSSSF)

UAE Pro League seasons
United
1991–92 in Emirati football